Gustaw Dadela (born 7 March 1995) is a Polish BMX rider who represented Poland in the time trial event at the 2015 UCI BMX World Championships.

References

External links
 
 

1995 births
Living people
BMX riders
Polish male cyclists
Place of birth missing (living people)